is a 24/7 Marathi-language movies channel launched on 1 May 2016. The Mumbai-based Parls Group owns the channel. Its broadcasting area is Maharashtra, India. This channel is available on the direct to home providers such as Tata Sky and Dish TV. It was previously available on Videocon d2h .

External links

Television stations in Mumbai
Television channels and stations established in 2016
2016 establishments in Maharashtra
Marathi-language television channels